Scymnus (Pullus) saciformis, is a species of lady beetle found in India, and Sri Lanka.

Biology
It is a predator of several aphids, mealybugs and whiteflies such as Aleurodicus dispersus and Aleurodicus rugioperculatus.

References

Coccinellidae
Insects of Sri Lanka
Beetles described in 1858